Jimmy Ee Veedinte Aishwaryam is a 2019 Malayalam film directed by Raju Chandra and produced by Shino John. The movies makes the debut of Mithun Ramesh in the lead role.

Synopsis
Jimmy is a businessman settled in Dubai with his family. He marries Jancy Vetilakaran whose life mainly revolves around her pet dog, whose name is also Jimmy. When she gets married, her relationship with her husband ends up in conflict.

Cast
Mithun Ramesh as Jimmy John Adakkakaran
Divya Pillai as Jancy Vettilakaran
Aju Varghese as Jimmy (voice)
Suraj Venjaramoodu as Dimitri Rodriguez
Joy Mathew as John Adakkakaran
Sreeja Ravi as Rosykutty
Idavela Babu as Kunnamkulam Baby
Johny Antony as Prem Prakash Pothen
Hareesh Kanaran as Ayyappan
Nirmal Palazhi as Salgunan

Release and reception
The movie was released on 6 December 2019 and generally received mixed reviews from the critics and audience. While some praised the comedy scenes in the movie, others criticised for the poor acting. The songs in the movies received little praise.

References

2019 films
2010s Malayalam-language films
Films shot in Dubai
Films set in the United Arab Emirates